Apache Struts 2 is an open-source web application framework for developing Java EE web applications. It uses and extends the Java Servlet API to encourage developers to adopt a model–view–controller (MVC) architecture. The WebWork framework spun off from Apache Struts 1 aiming to offer enhancements and refinements while retaining the same general architecture of the original Struts framework. In December 2005, it was announced that WebWork 2.2 was adopted as Apache Struts 2, which reached its first full release in February 2007.

Struts 2 has a history of critical security bugs, many tied to its use of OGNL technology; some vulnerabilities can lead to arbitrary code execution. In October 2017, it was reported that failure by Equifax to address a Struts 2 vulnerability advised in March 2017 was later exploited in the data breach that was disclosed by Equifax in September 2017.

Features 
 Simple POJO-based actions
 Simplified testability
 Thread safe
 AJAX support
 jQuery plugin
 Dojo Toolkit plugin (deprecated)
 Ajax client-side validation
 Template support
 Support for different result types
 Easy to extend with plugins
 REST plugin (REST-based actions, extension-less URLs)
 Convention plugin (action configuration via Conventions and Annotations)
 Spring plugin (dependency injection)
 Hibernate plugin
 Support in design
 JFreechart plugin (charts)
 jQuery plugin (Ajax support, UI widgets, dynamic table, charts)
 Rome plugin

See also 

 List of application servers
Comparison of web frameworks

References

External links 
 

Struts 2
Cross-platform free software
Free software programmed in Java (programming language)
Java enterprise platform
Web frameworks
Software using the Apache license
2006 software